The Purisima Formation is a geologic formation in California. It preserves fossils dating from the Late Miocene to Late Pliocene.

See also 

 List of fossiliferous stratigraphic units in California
 Paleontology in California

References

External links 
 

Geologic formations of the United States
Sandstone formations of the United States
Fossiliferous stratigraphic units of the United States
Neogene California
Paleontology in California
Siltstone formations
Conglomerate formations
Phosphorite formations